Arthur Henry Adams (4 September 1891 – 12 July 1969) was an Australian rules footballer who played for the South Melbourne Football Club in the Victorian Football League (VFL).

References

External links

1891 births
Sydney Swans players
Williamstown Football Club players
Australian rules footballers from Victoria (Australia)
1969 deaths